Marayong railway station is located on the Richmond line, serving the Sydney suburb of Marayong. It is served by Sydney Trains T1 Western and T5 Cumberland line services.

History
Marayong station opened on 2 October 1922. The line between Marayong and Quakers Hill was duplicated in 2002 and Marayong station was upgraded the following year.

Platforms & services

Transport links
Marayong station is served by one NightRide route:
N71: Richmond station to Town Hall station

Trackplan

References

External links

Marayong station details Transport for New South Wales

Easy Access railway stations in Sydney
Railway stations in Sydney
Railway stations in Australia opened in 1922
Richmond railway line
City of Blacktown